Margaret Sylvia Gilliland (8 September 1917 – 18 May 1990) was an Australian biochemist.

The daughter of Robert Dugald Bertie and Kathleen Crommelin, she was born Margaret Sylvia Bertie in Grenfell, New South Wales; her uncle Charles Henry Bertie was a librarian and historian. She received a BSc in biochemistry from the University of Melbourne. In 1942, she married Alexander Forbes Gilliland; the couple had three children. Gilliland later worked as a biochemistry demonstrator at the University of Queensland. She received a MSc from the University in 1962 and became a lecturer the following year. In 1969, she spent a year studying at the University of California, San Diego, funded by a graduate fellowship provided by the American Association of University Women.

She helped organize an expedition to the Moruroa atoll in 1973 to protest French nuclear testing in the Pacific. In 1978, she helped establish a multi-disciplinary program in community health at the master's level for the University of Queensland and served as director for the program. She retired from the University in 1988. She died at Karana Downs at the age of 72.

References 

1917 births
1990 deaths
Australian biochemists
Australian women chemists
University of Melbourne alumni
Academic staff of the University of Queensland
20th-century women scientists
20th-century Australian women